Pat McMahon (born 1 February 1942) is an Irish former long-distance runner. He competed in the marathon at the 1968 Summer Olympics.

McMahon ran collegiately for Oklahoma Baptist University, winning the 1965 and 1966 NAIA Men's Cross Country Championship individual titles and setting a record time of 19:53.6 in 1966. MCMahan won the NAIA 3,000 meter steeplechase championship in 1967. McMahon was inducted into the Oklahoma Baptist University Hall of Fame in 1976.

References

External links
 

1942 births
Living people
Athletes (track and field) at the 1968 Summer Olympics
Irish male long-distance runners
Irish male marathon runners
Olympic athletes of Ireland
Sportspeople from County Clare
Oklahoma Baptist University alumni